Osip Ivanovich Senkovsky, born Józef Julian Sękowski ( in Antagonka, near Vilnius –  in Saint Petersburg), was a Polish-Russian orientalist, journalist, and entertainer.

Life
Senkovsky was born into an old family of Lithuanian nobility. During his study in the University of Vilno he became fascinated with all things oriental. Having mastered the Arabic, Persian, Turkish, and Hebrew languages, he was assigned to the Russian mission in Constantinople, which occupation gave him ample opportunities to travel in Syria, Nubia, and Egypt. In 1821 he returned to the Russian capital, where he got the chair in oriental languages at the University of St Petersburg.

In the 1820s, Senkovsky started publishing in the popular periodicals of Kondraty Ryleyev and Faddei Bulgarin. He is best remembered for having edited the first Russian "thick journal," Library for Reading (1833-1856), whose lively and humorous style (as Nikolai Gogol put it) attracted to literary journals even those people who had never held a book in their hands.

Senkovsky encouraged new writers. He had a strong influence on Yelena Hahn and on Elizaveta Akhmatova. In the latter case he not only developed a writer but she regarded him as a parent, Akhmatova would eventually publish her own magazines and in time her own memoir of Senkowsky.

A very prolific writer, Senkovsky contributed articles on a wide range of topics, from mathematics to medicine. Under the pen-name of Baron Brambeus he published a series of fantastic voyages, including one to the center of the Earth (The Sentimental Journey to Mount Etna) and another to an antediluvian Egyptian civilization flourishing on the now-frozen Siberian plain (The Scientific Journey to Bear Island).

As a literary critic he had few principles, his motto being "easy reading and less thought". One day he would pronounce his friend Nestor Kukolnik to be Gogol's superior, only to place Gogol higher than Homer the very next day. He dismissed The Tale of Igor's Campaign as a clumsy fake, derogated Pushkin as a second-hand imitator, and declared the Tale of Bygone Years to be written in Polish.

During his last years, Senkovsky turned from literature to music. He claimed to have invented a five-stringed violin and a new type of oven. He also published pioneering studies of Chinese, Mongolian, and Tibetan languages.

He has been referred to as the founder of Litvinism.

References

1800 births
1858 deaths
People from Molėtai District Municipality
People from Lithuania Governorate
Journalists from the Russian Empire
Male writers from the Russian Empire
Russian science fiction writers
Russian orientalists
Litvinism
19th-century Polish writers
19th-century writers from the Russian Empire
19th-century journalists from the Russian Empire
Russian male journalists
Russian literary critics
Russian publishers (people)
Russian editors
19th-century male writers from the Russian Empire
Vilnius University alumni
Russian writers in Polish
Polish writers in Russian